This article lists the complete results of the group stage of the 2013 BWF World Junior Championships – Teams event in Bangkok, Thailand.

Group W1

China vs Spain

Singapore vs Australia

China vs Australia

Singapore vs Spain

China vs Singapore

Australia vs Spain

Group W2

Chinese Taipei vs Czech Republic

Russia vs Uzbekistan

Chinese Taipei vs Uzbekistan

Russia vs Czech Republic

Chinese Taipei vs Russia

Uzbekistan vs Czech Republic

Group X1

Indonesia vs Sri Lanka

France vs United States

Indonesia vs United States

France vs Sri Lanka

Indonesia vs France

United States vs Sri Lanka

Group X2

Malaysia vs Scotland

Bulgaria vs Philippines

Malaysia vs Philippines

Bulgaria vs Scotland

Malaysia vs Bulgaria

Philippines vs Scotland

Group Y1

Japan vs Finland

Germany vs Finland

Japan vs Germany

Group Y2

Thailand vs Canada

Denmark vs Botswana

Thailand vs Botswana

Denmark vs Canada

Thailand vs Denmark

Botswana vs Canada

Group Z1

South Korea vs South Africa

India vs South Africa

South Korea vs India

Group Z2

Hong Kong vs Armenia

Vietnam vs Turkey

Hong Kong vs Turkey

Vietnam vs Armenia

Hong Kong vs Vietnam

Turkey vs Armenia

References

2013 BWF World Junior Championships
2013 in youth sport